Egham Regatta is a rowing regatta on the River Thames in England which takes place at the end of June on the reach above Bell Weir Lock near Egham, Surrey. The regatta is run from Wraysbury Skiff and Punting Club and the  Runnymede Pleasure Grounds on the outskirts of Egham.

The regatta was inaugurated in 1909 and was affiliated to the Skiff Racing Association in 1913. It was suspended during World War I and had a chequered existence until it re-commenced in 1955 as a purely rowing regatta. In 1978 skiffing and punting were reintroduced making it the only regatta in the country that still provides racing for rowing, skiffing and punting.

Egham Regatta has a short sprint course of about 650 metres upstream from a stake boat start. The regatta is the last on the River Thames before Henley Royal Regatta and  provides sculling events for juniors in singles, doubles or coxed quads. It caters for competitors of all levels and ages from the relative newcomer upwards.

See also
Rowing on the River Thames

External links 
 Egham Regatta Website

Recurring events established in 1909
Regattas on the River Thames
Sport in Surrey